Colos (born 1981) is an Albanian rapper living in Germany. He is an artist of Mellow Vibes Records and is residing in Berlin.

Career
Born as Atdhe Gashi in Prizren, Yugoslavia - present day Kosovo, Colos immigrated to Berlin-Kreuzberg, Germany as a war refugee in 1994. At the age of 21, he ended his acquiescence in Germany and in early 2002 he returned to Kosovo, where he stayed 18 months. At the end of 2003 he returned to Germany seeking asylum, which was granted for a year. After this year, he remained illegally in Germany.

His label Soul Street was founded in 2004. A short time later joined the label VS Recordz together with the producers Woroc. Colos also founded the crew VS Mafia, to which today even the rapper Pain and ST Chagome and producer Kazanova belong.

In 2006, shortly after the release of his first solo album Honey blood, it signed Berlin Independent Hip Hop Label Mellow Vibes Records, which by Sami Mansour aka. Ben Zulu King and DJ Afrika Bambaataa was founded. On this label he released in May 2007 its 2nd Solo album Life in Exile, and received an entry in the Backspin HipHop Jahrbuch 2007.

End of 2007 turned Colos is for personal reasons to the authorities and was on 10 November 2007 returned to Kosovo.

After more than nine months stay in Kosovo is the native Albanians from Kosovo returned to Germany. After a few months after his arrival in Berlin was on 29 Colos September 2008 alongside the journalist and author Wolfgang Büscher, MTV presenter Patrice, gynecologist and Sami Ben Mansour a guest at the press conference on Germany's Forgotten Children soundtrack, which after three days on Mellow Vibes Records. On the soundtrack are just 50 tracks, d.a. Many famous singers and rappers like Kool Savas, Xavier Naidoo, D-Flame, and many others. The proceeds of the sampler is in the work of the Children and Youth Agency archetypes go, at least some of the estimated two million children in Germany live below the poverty line have to give a perspective.

Discography

Studio albums
2006: Honigblut
2007: Leben im Exil
2009: Independent

Notes and references
Notes:

References:

https://books.google.co.uk/books?id=zox4DwAAQBAJ&pg=PA284&dq=%22Colos%22+Kosovo+rap&hl=en&sa=X&ved=0ahUKEwjx1fKq2urfAhWLTRUIHUqrAVUQ6AEIKjAA#v=onepage&q=%22Colos%22%20Kosovo%20rap&f=false 
https://rap.de/c37-interview/6045-colos/ 
http://initiative-musik.de/kuenstler/kuenstler-a-bis-z/abc/colos.html

1981 births
Living people
Albanian rappers
German people of Albanian descent
German rappers
Kosovan emigrants to Germany
Musicians from Prizren